The U.S. Customs House or "Edificio Aduana" is a historic custom house building located at Mayagüez, Puerto Rico. As of February 10, 1988, the building was owned by the U.S. Customs Service, Washington, D.C.

History

It was built in 1838 to accommodate and lodge distinguished visitors that reached the port of Mayagüez.  In 1898 the building became a custom house. It originally had two floors but the second story was destroyed by the earthquake of 1918.  Its present architectonic line is from the year 1924, being the work of engineers Huiguera and Besosa, being its architect Mr. Rafael Carmoega.  On September 30, 1981 it was declared a Historical Building of the United States.

Architecture
The most important construction of the city of Mayagüez in attention to its general aesthetic values it is a beautiful building of  "anfipróstilo" (two portals) style. Doric order (capitel) its influence being grecoroman, Tuscan and numbering "octástila" in smooth column (fuste) and "basas áticas".  The building is surrounded by arches and semi-pilasters that puts one in contact with a neoclassical style of Roman influence. It exhibits two pediments very sincréticos decorative and balustrades.  The structures upper portions are adorned with plates and "dentellones" of baroque influence. Its interior is of great beauty and of a Renaissance aesthetics of the Michelangelo style.  The structure is manufactured completely in reinforced concrete and the floors of terrazzo edged with white marble.

See also

United States Customs House (Fajardo, Puerto Rico)
United States Customs House (Ponce, Puerto Rico)

References

1838 establishments in Puerto Rico
Government buildings completed in 1838
Neoclassical architecture in Puerto Rico
Custom houses on the National Register of Historic Places
National Register of Historic Places in Mayagüez, Puerto Rico
Government buildings on the National Register of Historic Places in Puerto Rico
Beaux-Arts architecture in Puerto Rico